Aphrastus is a genus of broad-nosed weevils in the family Curculionidae. There are at least 3 described species in Aphrastus.

Species
 Aphrastus griseus Blatchley, 1916
 Aphrastus taeniatus Say, 1831
 Aphrastus unicolor Horn, 1876

References

 Alonso-Zarazaga, Miguel A., and Christopher H. C. Lyal (1999). A World Catalogue of Families and Genera of Curculionoidea (Insecta: Coleoptera) (Excepting Scotylidae and Platypodidae), 315.
 Poole, Robert W., and Patricia Gentili, eds. (1996). "Coleoptera". Nomina Insecta Nearctica: A Check List of the Insects of North America, vol. 1: Coleoptera, Strepsiptera, 41-820.

Further reading

 Arnett, R. H. Jr., M. C. Thomas, P. E. Skelley and J. H. Frank. (eds.). (21 June 2002). American Beetles, Volume II: Polyphaga: Scarabaeoidea through Curculionoidea. CRC Press LLC, Boca Raton, Florida .
 
 Richard E. White. (1983). Peterson Field Guides: Beetles. Houghton Mifflin Company.

Entiminae